The Black Book of Poland is a 750-page report published in 1942 by the Ministry of Information of the Polish government-in-exile, describing atrocities committed by Germany in occupied Poland in the 22 months between the invasion of Poland in September 1939, and the end of June 1941. 

All the estimates, presented in the book section by section, are based on data collected while the war in the East was in progress, and the killing of Jews by means of carbon monoxide gas during Operation Reinhard – launched in 1942 to implement the "Final Solution" – had only begun. All casualties are partly summarized. The book documents over 400,000 cases of deliberate killings – an average of 1,576 per day. 

The Black Book of Poland is considered a follow-up to The Polish White Book of 1941.

Contents
The Black Book is a collection of authenticated documents, depositions, eye-witness accounts, and Ministerial summaries, describing and illustrating with photographs, the Nazi crimes against the Polish nation and War crimes in occupied Poland during World War II committed in mere two years: including massacres, tortures, expulsions, forced colonization, persecution, destruction of culture, and humiliation of a nation. 

The book is a sequel to The German Invasion of Poland compiled by the Polish government-in-exile and published in 1940, sometimes considered as the first volume of this publication series. The original volume deals with the war crimes of the September 1939 invasion of Poland. The Black Book by G.P. Putnam's Sons of New York (or the 'second volume' of The Black Book of Poland) was published in London by Hutchinson under a different title: The German New Order in Poland, with only 585 pages and 61 plates. The Black Book is composed of nine sections, preceded by an Introduction titled 'Hora Tenebrarum'. All sections include long Appendices.

Book sections
 Part I. Massacres and Tortures 
 Part II. The Expulsion of the Polish Population from its Land 
 Part III. The Persecution of the Jews, and the Ghettos 
 Part IV. The Robbery of Public and Private Property
 Part V. The Economic Exploitation of Polish Territories under German Occupation
 Part VI. Religious Persecution
 Part VII. Humiliation and Degradation of the Polish Nation
 Part VIII. The Destruction of Polish Culture
 Part IX. Violations by the Reich of International Law.

See also
Karski's reports

Notes

External links 
Worldcat.org, 'The Black Book of Poland / The German New Order in Poland'.
Photograph of the book with dust jacket. The German New Order in Poland. Reprint. Archive.is

Government reports
1942 in Poland
1942 documents
1942 in England
Holocaust historiography
Holocaust historical documents
The Holocaust in Poland
International response to the Holocaust